Allissa V. Richardson, Ph.D. is an American journalist and college professor. She is best known as a proponent of mobile journalism and citizen journalism. Richardson has trained students in the United States and Africa to report news using only smartphones, tablets and MP3 players. She is Assistant Professor of Journalism in the Annenberg School for Communication and Journalism at the University of Southern California. Additionally, Richardson is a Nieman Foundation Visiting Journalism Fellow at Harvard University, the 2012 Educator of the Year for the National Association of Black Journalists, and a two-time Apple Distinguished Educator.

Biography

Early life and education
Richardson holds a Doctor of Philosophy degree in Journalism Studies from the University of Maryland College Park. Her dissertation is titled, "Bearing Witness While Black: African Americans, Smartphones and the New Protest #Journalism." Richardson explored the lives of 15 mobile journalist-activists who documented the Black Lives Matter movement using only their smartphones and Twitter.

Richardson earned a Master of Science in Journalism with a concentration in Magazine Publishing, Writing and Editing from the Medill School of Journalism at Northwestern University. She holds a Bachelor of Science in Biology from Xavier University of Louisiana too.

Journalism career
Richardson began her journalism career in 2002 as a general assignment intern for the Observer-Dispatch in Utica, New York, after winning a Freedom Forum scholarship. In 2003, Johnson Publishing Company selected her as its inaugural intern for Jet magazine. She was promoted to assistant editor of Jet at the end of her internship. Richardson chronicled what she described as a "once-in-a-lifetime experience" of working alongside Jet'''s founder, John H. Johnson, in a personal essay titled "Farewell and Thank You to John H. Johnson", after he died in 2005. She wrote: "When Mr. Johnson died Aug. 8 at the age of 87, I was torn between feeling selfishly saddened by his departure and enormously grateful for the inroads he made in American journalism". Richardson has reported on Capitol Hill as an assistant editor of food policy for Food Chemical News. She also has written on health, technology and culture for O, The Oprah Magazine, The Baltimore Sun and the Chicago Tribune.

Academic career
At 25, Richardson joined the faculty of Morgan State University. She served as coordinator of its journalism program, and launched and directed the Morgan MOJO Lab in 2010. Students enrolled in her MOJO Lab classes learned to report news using only iPod Touch devices. Morgan State University became the first and only historically black college in the country to offer mobile journalism courses. Richardson accepted a professorship at Bowie State University in Fall 2012. She relocated the MOJO Lab to its campus. She was a mobile media professor in the Emerging Media and Technology division until 2017. After earning her doctorate, Richardson joined the journalism faculty at the University of Southern California in Los Angeles. She holds a dual appointment in both the journalism and communication departments within the Annenberg School. She studies black feminist media, communication and social justice, mobile journalism, networked journalism, race and the media, and visual communication theory.

Medical career
Richardson worked as a laboratory researcher for the U.S. Food and Drug Administration while studying biology at Xavier University of Louisiana. Her initial career goal was to become a clinical neonatologist who studied ways to decrease nosocomial infections in newborn babies. Her FDA research focus was antimicrobial resistance. Richardson was accepted to the Howard University College of Medicine in 2002, but declined the offer to matriculate. She completed her bachelor of science degree in biology, but decided to follow her passion for writing instead. She enrolled in the Medill School of Journalism at Northwestern University that year and won its Weinstein-Luby Outstanding Young Journalist award.

Lectures and media appearances
Richardson has given lectures on mobile journalism throughout Africa, Europe and the United States.Akilah Bolden-Monifa, "Public Relations and Journalism: The Intersecting Highway", CBS Diversity Blog, August 23, 2010. She has appeared at Harvard University, South by Southwest, Online EDUCA Berlin, the MacArthur Foundation-supported Digital Media and Learning Conference, and many colleges, universities, libraries and United States embassies. Richardson has appeared on NPR to discuss innovation in journalism and education. Her company, MOJO MediaWorks, has been featured in Black Enterprise.

Awards and recognition
2016 Dr. Mabel S. Spencer Award for Excellence in Graduate Achievement – University of Maryland College Park  
2016 Global Apple Distinguished Educator – Apple, Inc.
2014 Nieman Foundation Visiting Journalism Fellow – Harvard University
2013 Apple Distinguished Educator – Apple, Inc.
2013 Outstanding Junior Faculty Professor of the Year – Bowie State University
2012 Journalism Educator of the Year – National Association of Black Journalists
2012 Top 100 Women in Digital – Digital Sisterhood Network 
2010 New Voices, Newsroom Innovator – JLab at American University
2007 Dean’s Award for Excellence in Teaching & Advising – Morgan State University
2003 Weinstein-Luby Outstanding Young Journalist – Medill School of Journalism
2002 Freedom Forum Chips Quinn Scholar – Gannett Company
2002 Beta Beta Beta Biological Honor Society – Xavier University of Louisiana

Activism
Richardson has called for state-level education reform that would mandate the integration of mobile devices in classrooms to create personal learning environments, which empower students to take ownership of their learning experiences."Teaching Kids Through Mobile Media", Open Society Institute, June 20, 2011.

Richardson is the founder of MOJOPro (formerly known as MOJO MediaWorks). The company creates iPad/iPod storytelling workshops for youth, and mobile learning professional development workshops for educators. In 2012, Richardson co-created the traveling iPod storytelling workshop for the nationally syndicated PBS film, Slavery by Another Name. In 2013, The Washington Post invited her to create a monthly iPad journalism workshop series for journalists, teachers and students in the Washington-Metropolitan area.

Richardson has served as an advisory board member for Global Girl Media. The organization trains girls to shoot and edit news using traditional cameras. Richardson created its first mobile journalism curriculum in 2011, and trained young women in South Africa and Morocco to report news using iPod Touch devices.

Richardson also has served as an advisory board member for Black Girls Code (BGC). BGC trains girls of color to create websites, mobile applications and robot prototypes. In March 2013, Richardson created its first youth mobile journalism workshop that launched at South by Southwest in Austin, Texas. The project's novelty earned Richardson and her company national acclaim in Black Enterprise'' magazine as a technology firm on the rise.

References

External links
Allissa Richardson – USC Official Faculty Page
Allissa Richardson – Researchgate Profile 
Allissa Richardson – Academia.edu Profile 
Allissa Richardson  – Google Scholar Profile

African-American academics
American women academics
Journalism academics
Alternative journalists
African-American activists
African-American women journalists
African-American journalists
Xavier University of Louisiana alumni
Medill School of Journalism alumni
Living people
1981 births
Bowie State University faculty
American women journalists
Academics from Washington, D.C.
21st-century African-American people
21st-century African-American women
20th-century African-American people
20th-century African-American women